This is a list of notable footballers who have played with Wolverhampton Wanderers F.C.. The aim is for this list to include all players that have played 100 or more senior matches for the club. Other players who are deemed to have played an important role for the club can be included, but the reason for their notability should be included in the 'Notes' column.

For a list of Wolverhampton Wanderers players with a Wikipedia article, see :Category:Wolverhampton Wanderers F.C. players, and for the current first-team squad see Wolverhampton Wanderers F.C.#First team squad.

Appearance figures should include total senior appearances and goals, and not only those in the Football League, although wartime games should be excluded.

Table

Players should be listed according to alphabetical order of surname.

References
 
 
 
 

Players
 
Wolverhampton Wanderers
Association football player non-biographical articles